At the end of the "Big Reunion" episode in season 7, Sonja and Daniel confirmed the return of Ich bin ein Star - Holt mich hier raus! for its eighth season in 2014. Helmut Berger said to Austrian newspaper Kurier, that he would like to go back to the camp in the new series.
Season 8's Michael Wendler was the first contestant ever to intend a re-entry into the camp after his voluntary exit on day 4.

Contestants

Bushtucker Trials

Total number of Bushtucker Trials done by each participant:

References 

2014 German television seasons
08